Elvidin Krilić (born 30 September 1962; more commonly known as Edo Krila), is a Bosnian musician, accordionist, composer and educator. He was born in Sarajevo to a family that cherished Bosnian traditional folk music. As a young boy, he received his first musical inspiration from his father Mustafa Krilić, a well-known accordionist who worked with the major traditional vocalists of the ex-Yugoslav music scene from World War II on. 
   
After Elvidin Krilić completed elementary school, he entered the Secondary Music School in Sarajevo. Although Sarajevo was a center of European music activity, it did not have higher education programs for piano accordion, so Krilić studied clarinet with Professor Rajmund Likić. Although the clarinet was completely new to him, Krilić soon began to win provincial and national awards. He continued to improve his accordion skills as well, and made his first public appearances on accordion as a teen. He was an active member of the AKUD Slobodan Princip Seljo, one of the best-known cultural and artistic clubs in the former country. After completing the Secondary Music School, Krilić studied at the Sarajevo Music Academy with Professor A. Radan.
 
At that time, the legend of sevdalinka, the late Ismet Alajbegović Šerbo, retired from the Folk Orchestra of the RTV Sarajevo. Krilić auditioned for and won the position, beginning his long professional career which eventually brought him together with many eminent soloists of traditional music.
 
At the outbreak of the war in Bosnia and Herzegovina, Krilić lived in Grbavica, the residential quarter of Sarajevo. When his two-year-old son was seriously injured, Krilić's family was relocated to Austria. Krilić remained in Sarajevo for the next two years to direct the Folk Orchestra of the RTVSA. He then joined his family in Austria, where he began a new career as a music teacher. He attended and graduated from the Austrian Music Conservatory, where he focused on classical accordion music. A versatile musician equally skilled in Eastern and Western musical traditions, he retains his love for the folk music of his people, appears with many traditional music stars, and actively helps young, talented musicians seeking to take their places in the music world.

External links
Edo Krilić
Facebook page "Edo Krilić´s Salon Balkan"
 Edo Krilić performs his own Sar-Pari Waltz (video)

1962 births
Living people
Musicians from Sarajevo
Sevdalinka
Bosniaks of Bosnia and Herzegovina